Princess Elizabeth (Elizaveta) Esperovna Beloselskaya-Belozerskaya, later Princess Trubetskaya (20 November 1834, Saint Petersburg - 30 March 1907, Saint Petersburg), was a Russian noblewoman, lady-in-waiting and a salonist.

Early life
Elizaveta Esperovna, nicknamed Lise, was by birth member of an ancient House of Belosselsky-Belozersky. She was the eldest daughter of Prince Esper Beloselsky-Belozersky (1802-1846) and the maid of honour Elena (Helena) Pavlovna Bibikova (1812-1888).

Biography
Elizaveta was the maid of honour of Grand Duchess Maria Alexandrovna. She married in 1851 Prince Pyotr Nikitich Trubetskoy (1826-1880), True State Councillor and Saint Petersburg district leader of the nobility.

By the time her portrait was painted by Winterhalter in 1859, she had already three children: Elena (1853-1917), Sergei (1855-1856) and Alexandra (born 1857 Paris -1949). Other children were: Olga (1860-died at the age of 19 from consumption), Alexander (1867-1912/1917) and Maria (1872-1954). 

After the death of her husband, Elizaveta Esperovna began to spend more time abroad, lived in France, where she kept a political salon.
She hosted a famous literary salon in Paris during the Second Empire, and played a crucial part as a mediator when France and Russia reestablished their diplomatic contacts in the 1870s. Her salon was attended by many famous politicians: Prince Kochubey, Ivan Durnovo and others. The princess was in correspondence with many political figures of the time: Francois Guizot, 3rd Viscount Palmerston, Adolphe Thiers and Prince Alexander Gorchakov.

Her aunt, singer and composer Princess Zinaida Alexandrovna Volkonskaya Beloselskaya (1789-1862), was at one time the owner of a famous literary salon, which was visited by famous writers Mitskevich, Baratynsky, Venevitinov, DeVitte, A.S. Pushkin also visited there.

Lise was the owner of the Elizavetino summer estate from 1852 in the Saint Petersburg province, the main building was designed by architect Harald Julius von Bosse in 1874, and a collector of material about the Trubetskoy family. The family grave was situated in Vladimir Church in Elizavetino, where she was buried alongside her husband and children. 

She was grandmother of Princess Aurora Pavlovna Demidova di San Donato, great-grandmother of Prince Regent Paul of Yugoslavia, through her daughter Princess Elena (Hélène) Petrovna Trubetskaya Demidova (1853-1917).

References 

1834 births
1907 deaths
Ladies-in-waiting from the Russian Empire
Salon holders from the Russian Empire